LaVonne Idlette (born October 31, 1985 in Miami, United States) is an American hurdler competing internationally for the Dominican Republic. At the 2012 Summer Olympics, she competed in the Women's 100 metres hurdles.

Her personal bests are 12.77 seconds in the 100 metres hurdles (+1.8 m/s, Montverde 2013) and 8.16 seconds in the 60 metres hurdles (Sopot 2014). Both are current Dominican Republic records.

Idlette appeared on The Amazing Race 32 with Kellie Wells and placed tenth and being the second team eliminated.

Competition record

References

1985 births
Living people
Dominican Republic female hurdlers
Olympic athletes of the Dominican Republic
Athletes (track and field) at the 2012 Summer Olympics
World Athletics Championships athletes for the Dominican Republic
Athletes (track and field) at the 2011 Pan American Games
Athletes (track and field) at the 2015 Pan American Games
The Amazing Race (American TV series) contestants
Pan American Games competitors for the Dominican Republic